Endocardial cushions project into the atrial canal, and, meeting in the middle line, unite to form the septum intermedium which divides the canal into two channels, the future right and left atrioventricular orifices.

References

External links
 Overview at edu.mt

Embryology of cardiovascular system